Typhoon Rose, known in the Philippines as Typhoon Uring, was the most violent and intense tropical cyclone to strike Hong Kong since Typhoon Wanda in 1962. The 21st named storm of the 1971 Pacific typhoon season, Rose developed from an area of disturbed weather while west of Guam on August 9. Moving west-northwestward, the storm briefly became a typhoon on the following day. After weakening to a tropical storm on August 11, Rose re-intensified into a typhoon several hours later. Later that day, the typhoon made landfall near Palanan, Isabela in the Philippines. Rose weakened significantly while crossing the island of Luzon and was a minimal typhoon upon reaching the South China Sea on August 14.

The storm intensified significantly and re-curved northwestward in response to a weakening high-pressure area. Early on August 16, Rose attained its maximum sustained wind speed of  – equivalent to a Category 4 hurricane on the National Hurricane Center's Saffir–Simpson hurricane wind scale. Thereafter, the storm weakened slightly before making landfall at Lantau Island, Hong Kong, with winds of  late on August 16. Rose rapidly weakened to a tropical storm early the following day and dissipated several hours later.

Mostly minor wind impact was recorded in the Philippines, limited to downed communication lines and damaged houses. Offshore Hong Kong, storm surge and heavy waves sank or severely damaged at least 300 boats, causing 110 deaths and 283 injuries. Inland, heavy rainfall flooded low-lying areas and resulted in numerous landslides. A fire ignited at a large power sub-station in Kwun Tong and was difficult to extinguish due to strong winds. The fire caused blackouts in Kowloon Peninsula and New Territories, trapping thousands of people in elevators. A total of 5,644 people were left homeless, while 653 huts were destroyed. Approximately 30,000 telephones became out of service. Twenty other fatalities occurred in Hong Kong.

Meteorological history

On August 6, the Japan Meteorological Agency (JMA) began monitoring an area of disturbed weather in the vicinity of the Federated States of Micronesia. By early the next day, satellite imagery indicated the presence of a small circulation north of Chuuk. Radars at Fleet Weather Central and Andersen Air Force Base on Guam detected spiral convective bands crossing the island on August 9. Rose quickly strengthened and became a typhoon around 12:00 UTC on August 10. Early the following day, the system briefly weakened back to a tropical storm, before re-acquiring typhoon status hours later.

The storm weakened further while crossing island of Luzon and emerged into the South China Sea early on August 14 as a minimal typhoon. Rose immediately began to re-intensify. Deepening continued, with the typhoon peaking with maximum sustained winds of  – equal to a Category 4 hurricane on the Saffir–Simpson hurricane wind scale – early on August 16. Later that day, a ship in the vicinity of the eye observed a barometric pressure of  – the lowest in relation to the cyclone.

At around 12:00 UTC on August 16, reports from the JTWC indicate that Rose weakened slightly while approaching the Hong Kong and the coast of China. Rose was the most intense typhoon to strike Hong Kong since Wanda in 1962. Moving inland, the system rapidly weakened to a tropical storm early on August 17 and dissipated shortly thereafter.

Preparations
In Hong Kong and the Royal Observatory, a strong wind signal, no. 3, was hoisted at 13:05 UTC on August 16. That day, the Royal Observatory warned that because of the small size of Rose, winds might increase rapidly. The storm signal, no. 7, was raised at 05:50 UTC on August 17. Less than three hours later, the storm signal was changed to no. 8.

Impact

However, impact was relatively minor, with Luzon escaping serious damage. Downed communication lines and damage to houses were reported.

Rose produced a fog bank before making landfall, which is unusual for a tropical cyclone. The storm was the strongest cyclone to strike Hong Kong since Typhoon Wanda in 1962. The storm surge and heavy waves proved dangerous to ships offshore, at least 300 boats sank or were badly damaged by the typhoon. Eighty-eight deaths occurred after the Hong Kong-Macau ferry  capsized. The USS Regulus, a United States Navy vessel, was among the ships that suffered damage. Three United States Seventh Fleet rescue ships searched for survivors. Additionally, Royal Navy minesweepers and Royal Air Force whirlwind helicopters also arrived at Hong Kong, with the latter coordinating with the marine police. Overall, the sinking ships resulted in 110 fatalities, as well as 300 injuries.

Many scaffolds, signboards, trees, and boughs were knocked down. Fire broke out around 15:00 UTC on August 16 at a large power sub-station in Kwun Tong. Due to the strong winds, firefighters were unable to sometimes unable to control the flames. By 16:30 UTC, the fire was put out. However, it triggered power outages, with blackouts in the Kowloon Peninsula and New Territories. Thousands of people were trapped in elevators during the widespread electrical failures. Several low-lying areas were flooded. Numerous landslides blocked approximately 110 roads, 30 of which were severely obstructed. One landslide buried four children after crashing into their village hut, killing two, while one survived and was taken to the hospital, and the fourth remained missing.

A total of 5,644 people – approximately 1,032 families – were left homeless, with 653 huts destroyed. Twenty-four buildings were damaged, with six beyond repair or demolished. Communications were disrupted, with 30,000 telephones out of service. Hundreds of pigs and over 40,000 chickens as well as other poultry were killed. Roughly 1,356 hectares of vegetable and garden crops damaged. Additionally, 20,000 fruit trees were blown down. Considerable loss of pond fish due to overflow was also reported. On land, Rose was attributed to 24 fatalities.

See also

 Tropical cyclone
 List of tropical cyclones

References

External links
 Rose 1971 best track data
 Rose 1971 unisys track
 S. Campbell, "Typhoons affecting Hong Kong: Case Studies", Hong Kong University of Science and Technology, April 2005

1971 Pacific typhoon season
Typhoon Rose
Typhoons
Typhoons in Hong Kong